The 1992 Grand Prix Passing Shot, also known as the Bordeaux Open, was a men's tennis tournament played on outdoor clay courts at Villa Primrose in Bordeaux, France that was part of the World Series of the 1992 ATP Tour. It was the 15th edition of the tournament and was held from 14 September until 20 September 1992. Unseeded Andrei Medvedev won the singles title.

Finals

Singles

 Andrei Medvedev defeated  Sergi Bruguera 6–3, 1–6, 6–2
 It was Medvedev's 3rd singles title of the year and of his career.

Doubles

 Sergio Casal /  Emilio Sánchez defeated  Arnaud Boetsch /  Guy Forget 6–1, 6–4

References

External links
 ITF tournament edition details

Grand Prix Passing Shot
ATP Bordeaux
Grand Prix Passing Shot
Grand Prix Passing Shot